

Events 
 January–June 
 February 1 – Queen Elizabeth I of England signs the death warrant of her cousin Mary, Queen of Scots, after Mary has been implicated in a plot to murder Elizabeth. Seven days later, on the orders of Elizabeth's privy council, Mary is beheaded at Fotheringhay Castle.
 February 12–24 – Period of exceptionally severe cold in western Europe.
 April 29 – Singeing the King of Spain's Beard: On an expedition against Spain, English privateer Sir Francis Drake leads a raid in the Bay of Cádiz, sinking at least 23 ships of the Spanish fleet.
 May 19 – John Davis sets out from Dartmouth, Devon, for a third attempt to find the Northwest Passage.

 July–December 
 July 22 – Roanoke Colony: A group of English settlers arrive on Roanoke Island off North Carolina, to re-establish the deserted colony.
 August 18 – According to legend, Saul Wahl is named king of Poland; he is deposed the following day.  
 August 19 – Polish and Lithuanian nobles elect Sigismund III Vasa as their king.
 August 27 – Governor John White leaves the Roanoke Colony to get more supplies from England.
 October 1 – Shāh ‘Abbās I "The Great" succeeds as Shahanshah of Iran.
 October 18 – Landing of the first Filipinos: The first Filipinos in North America land in Morro Bay, near San Luis Obispo in modern-day California.
 October 20 – Battle of Coutras: Huguenot forces under Henry of Navarre defeat Royalist forces under Anne de Joyeuse, favorite of King Henry; Joyeuse is killed.
 October 31 – Leiden University Library opens its doors, after its founding in 1575.

 Date unknown 
 Toyotomi Hideyoshi becomes Daijō-daijin of Japan and concludes the Kyūshū Campaign with the Siege of Kagoshima at which most of Kyushu is surrendered to him; he banishes European Christian missionaries from the province.
 A severe famine breaks out in  Ming dynasty China.
 The Rose (theatre) is founded in London by Philip Henslowe.
 The chapbook Historia von D. Johann Fausten, printed by Johann Spies in Frankfurt, is the first published version of the Faust story. 
 Everard Digby's De Arte Natandi, the first treatise on swimming in England, is published.
 St. Dominic's Church, Macau is established.
 Hailuoto, an island in the Bothnian Bay, is separated from the grand parish of Saloinen into an independent parish.

Births 

 January 2 – Anders Arrebo, Danish writer (d. 1637)
 January 5 – Xu Xiake, Chinese adventurer and geographer (d. 1641)
 January 6 – Gaspar de Guzmán, Count-Duke of Olivares, Spanish politician (d. 1645)
 January 8
 Jan Pieterszoon Coen, Governor-General of the Dutch East Indies (d. 1629)
 Johannes Fabricius, Frisian/German astronomer (d. 1616)
 January 12 – John Winthrop, English Puritan lawyer (d. 1649)
 February 1 – Pál Esterházy, Hungarian noble (d. 1645)
 February 3 – Dorothea Hedwig of Brunswick-Wolfenbüttel, Princess of Anhalt-Zerbst (d. 1609)
 February 20 – Emanuel Sueyro, Dutch historian, translator, spymaster (d. 1629)
 February 26 – Stefano Landi, Italian composer (d. 1639)
 March 17 – David Lindsay, 1st Lord Balcarres, Scottish politician and noble (d. 1642)
 April 1 – Sir John Mill, 1st Baronet, English politician (d. 1648)
 April 2 – Virginia Centurione Bracelli, Italian saint (d. 1651)
 April 18 – Sir Charles Morrison, 1st Baronet, Member of the Parliament of England (d. 1628)
 April 26
 Ferdinando Gonzaga, Duke of Mantua, Italian Catholic cardinal (d. 1626)
 Abraham van der Haagen, Dutch painter (d. 1639)
 April 28 – Krzysztof Ossoliński, Polish nobleman (d. 1645)
 April 29 – Sophie of Saxony, Duchess of Pomerania (d. 1635)
 April 30 – Éléonore de Bourbon, Dutch princess (d. 1619)
 May 7 – Richard Newport, 1st Baron Newport, English politician (d. 1651)
 May 8 – Victor Amadeus I, Duke of Savoy (d. 1637)
 May 17 – Esaias van de Velde, Dutch painter (d. 1630)
May - Esaias van de Velde, Dutch landscape painter (died 1630)
 May 26 – Susan de Vere, Countess of Montgomery, English noblewoman (d. 1628)
 June 2 – Willem Bontekoe, skipper in the Dutch East India Company (d. 1657)
 June 5 – Robert Rich, 2nd Earl of Warwick, English colonial administrator and admiral (d. 1658)
 June 11 – Sir Thomas Jervoise, English politician (d. 1654)
 June 15 – Gabriel Gustafsson Oxenstierna, Swedish statesman (d. 1640)
 June 21 – Kaspar von Barth, German philologist and writer (d. 1658)
 June 24
 William Arnold, American settler (d. 1676)
 Hans van Steenwinckel the Younger, Danish architect (d. 1639)
 July 4 – Magdalene of Bavaria, Consort of Wolfgang William, Count Palatine of Neuburg (d. 1628)
 August 16 – Khusrau Mirza, Mughal prince (d. 1622)
 August 18 – Virginia Dare, Virginia colony settler
 August 23 – Johann Friedrich, Count Palatine of Sulzbach-Hilpoltstein (1614–1644) (d. 1644)
 August 28 – Christian William of Brandenburg, administrator of bishoprics of Magdeburg and Halberstadt (d. 1665)
 September 1 – Gómez Suárez de Figueroa, 3rd Duke of Feria, Spanish general (d. 1634)
 September 3 – Countess Juliane of Nassau-Siegen, Landgravine of Hesse-kassel (d. 1643)
 September 18 – Francesca Caccini, Italian composer
 September 19
 Robert Sanderson, English theologian and casuist (d. 1663)
 Mu Zeng, Chinese politician (d. 1646)
 October 8 – Thomas Howard, 1st Earl of Berkshire, English politician (d. 1669)
 October 17 – Nathan Field, English dramatist and actor (d. 1620)
 October 18 – Philippe-Charles, 3rd Count of Arenberg (d. 1640)
 October 19 – Thomas Dacres, English politician (d. 1668)
 October 22 – Joachim Jungius, German mathematician and philosopher (d. 1657)
 October 23 – Sir Gilbert Gerard, 1st Baronet of Harrow on the Hill, English politician (d. 1670)
 November 3 – Samuel Scheidt, German composer (d. 1653)
 November 17
 Charles Lallemant, French Jesuit (d. 1674)
 Joost van den Vondel, Dutch dramatist and poet (d. 1679)
 November 25 – Sir Gervase Clifton, 1st Baronet, English politician (d. 1666)
 December 13 – Emmanuel Stupanus, Swiss physician (d. 1664)
 December 19 – Dorothea Sophia, Abbess of Quedlinburg Abbey (1618–1645) (d. 1645)
 December 30 – Simon VII, Count of Lippe-Detmold (1613–1627) (d. 1627)
 date unknown
 William Feilding, 1st Earl of Denbigh (d. 1643)
 Francis Kynaston, English courtier and poet (d. 1642)
 Yun Seondo, Korean politician and poet (d. 1671)
 Song Yingxing, Chinese encyclopedist (d. 1666)
 George Yeardley, English colonial administrator in America (d. 1627)

Deaths 

 January 31 – Juraj Drašković, Croatian Roman Catholic cardinal (b. 1525)
 January – Thomas Seckford, English official (b. 1515)
 February 8 – Mary, Queen of Scots (executed) (b. 1542)
 February 9 – Vincenzo Ruffo, Italian composer (b. 1510)
 February 13 – Dorothea of Saxony, Duchess of Brunswick-Wolfenbüttel (b. 1563)
 February 22 – Sophie of Brandenburg-Ansbach, princess of Brandenburg-Ansbach (b. 1535)
 February 26 – Magdalene of Lippe, Countess of Lippe by birth, and Landgravine of Hesse-Darmstadt (b. 1552)
 March 15 – Caspar Olevian, German theologian (b. 1536)
 March 30 – Ralph Sadler, English statesman (b. 1507)
 April 10 – Henry III, Duke of Münsterberg-Oels (b. 1542)
 April 11 – Thomas Bromley, English lord chancellor (b. 1530)
 April 8 – John Foxe, English author (b. 1516)
 April 14 – Edward Manners, 3rd Earl of Rutland (b. 1549)
 April 16 – Anne Seymour, Duchess of Somerset (b. c. 1510)
 May 9 – Jakob Schegk, German physician (b. 1511)
 May 17 – Gotthard Kettler, Duke of Courland and Semigallia (b. 1517)
 May 29 – Ignatius Ni'matallah, Syriac Orthodox patriarch of Antioch (b. )
 June 11 – Ōtomo Sōrin, Japanese Christian daimyō (b. 1530)
 June 15 – Frederick II, Duke of Holstein-Gottorp (b. 1568)
 June 23 – Ōmura Sumitada, Japanese Christian daimyō (b. 1533)
 July 7 – Joachim of Zollern, Titular Count of Hohenzollern (b. 1554)
 July 28 – Godfried van Mierlo, Dutch Dominican friar and bishop (b. 1518)
 August 14 – Guglielmo Gonzaga, Duke of Mantua (b. 1538)
 August 29 – Vincenzo Bellavere, Italian composer (b. c. 1540)
 September 3 – Henry Cheyne, 1st Baron Cheyne, English politician and baron (b. 1540)
 September 19 – Jacobus Pamelius, Belgian bishop (b. 1536)
 October 19 – Francesco I de' Medici, Grand Duke of Tuscany (b. 1541)
 October 20 – Anne de Joyeuse, Duke of Joyeuse, French commander, (b. 1560)
 November 1 – Alfonso d'Este, Lord of Montecchio, Italian nobleman (b. 1527)
 November 10 – Abe Motozane, Japanese warlord (b. 1513)
 November 13 – Hai Rui, Ming Dynasty "model official" (b. 1514)
 December 11 – Andreas Gaill, German jurist and statesman (b. 1526)
 date unknown
 Dudley Fenner, English Puritan divine (b. c. 1558)
 Jan Tarło, Polish nobleman (b. 1527)
 probable – George Whetstone, English writer (b. 1544)

References 

 Huang, Ray. 1587, a Year of No Significance: The Ming Dynasty in Decline (Yale University Press, 1982), on China during the Ming dynasty.
 Ott, Michael R. Fünfzehnhundertsiebenundachtzig: Literatur, Geschichte und die Historia von D. Johann Fausten (Frankfurt am Main, 2014) online.